The Argentina women's national field hockey squad records are the results for women's international field hockey competitions. The sport is controlled by the Argentine Hockey Confederation, the governing body for field hockey in Argentina.

Current senior squad

The women's squad for the current year has been last announced by Confederación Argentina de Hockey on 4 September 2022. Along the year, players have been added and some left behind, this being published in every list for the competitions and tours.

Technical Staff:
Team Leader: Carla Cocina
Team Manager: Victoria Villalba
Head Coach: Fernando Ferrara
Assistant Coaches: Mario Almada, Santiago Capurro and Alejandra Gulla
Medical Doctor: Javier Blanco and Gastón Giocoli
Physiotherapist: Gustavo Bertolino, Claudia Burkart and Catalina Maschwitz
Physical Trainer: Diego Ferrari
Video Technician: Gonzalo Romero and Juan Vazquez
Team captains: Agostina Alonso, Rocío Sánchez Moccia and Victoria Sauze

2023 squad
Players, caps and goals updated as of 5 March 2023.

INA Inactive
INJ Injured
INV Invitational
U21 Training with the junior team

Changes from 2022 call-ups

Changes from last year call-ups and throughout the current year. Caps and goals updated as of 30 September 2022

Annual results

Belgium test series

Great Britain test series

New Zealand test series

South American Games

United States test series

Real 4 Nations Cup

China test match (off the record)

London World Cup

Changzhou Champions Trophy

2018 goalscoring Table

Italy Test Match (off the record)

Pro League

Pan American Games

Spain test series (off the record)

Italy test series (off the record)

Germany test series

2019 goalscoring table

Test Matches Serie

Pro League

2020 goalscoring Table

Practice Matches Serie

Pro League

Test Matches

Pre-Olympic Practice Matches

Olympic Games

2021 goalscoring Table

Goals at unofficial matches in italics

Pan American Cup

Pro League

World Cup

Unofficial Japan Test Matches

{{footballbox collapsible
|date         = 2 September 2022
|round        = Test match
|team1        = 
|score        = 2 - 1
|team2        = 
|report       = 
|goals1       = Unknown
|goals2       =  'Forcherio|location     = Sakai, Japan
|result       = L
}}

Uruguay Test Matches

South American Games

Pro League

2022 goalscoring Table

Goals at unofficial matches in italics

2023

Ireland test match series

Pro League

Pan American Games

2023 goalscoring Table

Goals at unofficial matches not included

Annual call-ups

Previous to 1998, there is not information more than the names competing on each tournament.

Coach: Sergio Vigil

 Magdalena Aicega (3) 
 Mariela Antoniska (13) 
 Luciana Aymar (15) 
 Anabel Gambero (5) 
 Mariana González Oliva (12) 
 Alejandra Gulla (4) 
 Gabriela Liz (7) 
 Sofía MacKenzie (2) 
 Mercedes Margalot (14) 
 Karina Masotta (11) 
 Laura Mulhall (1) 
 Vanina Oneto (9) 
 Gabriela Pando (8) 
 Jorgelina Rimoldi (10) 
 Cecilia Rognoni (16) 
 Ayelén Stepnik (6) 

Coach: Sergio Vigil

 Magdalena Aicega (3) 
 Mariela Antoniska (1) 
 Inés Arrondo (18) 
 Luciana Aymar (8) 
 Silvia Corvalán (4) 
 Anabel Gambero (5) 
 Soledad García (2) 
 Mariana González Oliva (12) 
 Alejandra Gulla (9) 
 Andrea Haines (17) 
 María de la Paz Hernández (7)
 Mercedes Margalot (14) 
 Karina Masotta (11) 
 Natalia Morello (15) 
 Vanina Oneto 
 Jorgelina Rimoldi (10) 
 Cecilia Rognoni (16) 
 Ayelén Stepnik (6) 
 Paola Vukojicic (18) 

Coach: Sergio Vigil

 Magdalena Aicega (3) 
 Mariela Antoniska (1) 
 Inés Arrondo (7) 
 Luciana Aymar (8) 
 María Paz Ferrari (4) 
 Anabel Gambero (5) 
 Soledad García (2) 
 Mariana González Oliva (12) 
 Andrea Haines (17) 
 María de la Paz Hernández (15) 
 Laura Maiztegui (13) 
 Mercedes Margalot (14) 
 Karina Masotta (11) 
 Vanina Oneto (9) 
 Jorgelina Rimoldi (10) 
 Cecilia Rognoni (16) 
 Ayelén Stepnik (6) 
 Paola Vukojicic (18) 

Coach: Sergio Vigil

 Magdalena Aicega (3) 
 Virginia Alonso 
 Lucía Antona 
 Mariela Antoniska (1) 
 Carolina Armani 
 Inés Arrondo (4) 
 Luciana Aymar (8) 
 María Victoria Baetti 
 Bettina Balbiani 
 Claudia Burkart (24) 
 Matilde Canavosio 
 Ángela Cattaneo (22) 
 Florencia D'Elía (17) 
 Cecilia del Carril 
 Natalí Doreski (23) 
 Anabel Gambero (5) 
 Soledad García (2) 
 Mariana González Oliva (12) 
 Alejandra Gulla (7) 
 María de la Paz Hernández (15) 
 Laura Maiztegui (13) 
 Mercedes Margalot (14) 
 Karina Masotta (11) 
 María Reyna Moya 
 Vanina Oneto (9) 
 Jorgelina Rimoldi (10) 
 Macarena Rodríguez 
 Cecilia Rognoni (16) 
 Mariné Russo (19) 
 Nadia Silva 
 Ayelén Stepnik (6) 
 Paola Vukojicic (18) 

Coach: Sergio Vigil

 Magdalena Aicega (3) 
 Mariela Antoniska (1) 
 Inés Arrondo (21) 
 Luciana Aymar (8) 
 Claudia Burkart (24) 
 Natalí Doreski (23) 
 María Paz Ferrari (4) 
 Anabel Gambero (5) 
 Soledad García (2) 
 Mariana González Oliva (12) 
 Alejandra Gulla (7) 
 María de la Paz Hernández (15) 
 Laura Maiztegui (13) 
 Mercedes Margalot (14) 
 Karina Masotta (11) 
 Vanina Oneto (9) 
 María Inés Parodi (17) 
 Cecilia Rognoni (16) 
 Mariné Russo (19) 
 Ayelén Stepnik (6) 
 Paola Vukojicic (18) 

Coach: Sergio Vigil

 Gabriela Aguirre (22b) 
 Magdalena Aicega (3) 
 Mariela Antoniska (1) 
 Carolina Armani 
 Inés Arrondo (21) 
 Luciana Aymar (8) 
 María Victoria Baetti 
 Noel Barrionuevo (27) 
 Marien Bianchini (2) 
 Agustina Bouza (9b) 
 Claudia Burkart (24) 
 Ángela Cattaneo (22) 
 Florencia D'Elía (17b) 
 Silvina D'Elía (25) 
 Cecilia del Carril (11) 
 Marina di Giacomo (5) 
 Natalí Doreski (23) 
 María Paz Ferrari (4) 
 Soledad García (10) 
 Mariana González Oliva (12) 
 Alejandra Gulla (7) 
 María de la Paz Hernández (15) 
 Giselle Kañevsky (26) 
 Laura Maiztegui (13) 
 Daniela Maloberti (29) 
 Mercedes Margalot (14) 
 Vanina Oneto (9) 
 Belén Pallito (5b) 
 María Inés Parodi (17) 
 Macarena Rodríguez (28) 
 Cecilia Rognoni (16) 
 Yanina Rojas (32) 
 Andrea Rubin (31) 
 Mariné Russo (19) 
 Nadia Silva (20) 
 Ayelén Stepnik (6) 
 Belén Succi (28b) 
 Paola Vukojicic (18) 
 Mariana Camilloni Candelaria Méndez Gabriela Monis Carla Rebecchi Juliana Schoeller Belén SimmermacherCoach: Sergio Vigil

 Magdalena Aicega (3) 
 Mariela Antoniska (1) 
 Inés Arrondo (21) 
 Luciana Aymar (8) 
 Claudia Burkart (24) 
 Ángela Cattaneo (22) 
 Marina di Giacomo (5) 
 Natalí Doreski (23) 
 María Paz Ferrari (4) 
 Soledad García (10) 
 Mariana González Oliva (12) 
 Alejandra Gulla (7) 
 María de la Paz Hernández (15) 
 Mercedes Margalot (14) 
 Vanina Oneto (9) 
 Lucía Pereyra  
 Carla Rebecchi (20) 
 Macarena Rodríguez (28) 
 Cecilia Rognoni (16) 
 Mariné Russo (19) 
 Ayelén Stepnik (6) 
 Paola Vukojicic (18) 

Coach: Gabriel Minadeo—February

Magdalena Aicega (3) 
Laura Aladro (13) 
Mariela Antoniska (1) 
Inés Arrondo (21) 
Luciana Aymar (8) 
Victoria Baetti 
Marien Bianchini (2) 
Claudia Burkart (24) 
Florencia D'Elía (17) 
Natalí Doreski (23) 
María Paz Ferrari 
Eugenia Ferrero 
Soledad García (10) 
Mariana González Oliva (12) 
Alejandra Gulla (7) 
María de la Paz Hernández (15) 
Rosario Luchetti (4) 
Daniela Maloberti (29) 
Mercedes Margalot (14) 
Vanina Nieruczkow 
Belén Pallitto (5) 
María José Palmieri 
Romina Pzellinsky 
Carla Rebecchi (11) 
Macarena Rodríguez (9) 
Cecilia Rognoni (16) 
Mariné Russo (19) 
Melisa Salmieri 
Ayelén Stepnik (6) 
Anahí Totongi 
Romina Vatteone 
Paola Vukojicic (18) 
Added in April:
 Angela Cattáneo 
 Cecilia del Carril 

Coach: Gabriel Minadeo

Gabriela Aguirre (22) 
Magdalena Aicega (3) 
Laura Aladro (13) 
Mariela Antoniska (1) 
Luciana Aymar (8) 
Noel Barrionuevo (27) 
Marien Bianchini (2) 
Agustina Bouza (9) 
Claudia Burkart (24) 
Florencia D'Elía (17) 
Silvina D'Elía (25) 
Soledad García (10) 
Mariana González Oliva (12) 
Alejandra Gulla (7) 
María de la Paz Hernández (15) 
Giselle Kañevsky (26) 
Rosario Luchetti (4) 
Daniela Maloberti (29) 
Mercedes Margalot (14) 
Belén Pallitto (5) 
Carla Rebecchi (11) 
Yanina Rojas (32) 
Andrea Rubin (31) 
Mariné Russo (19) 
Nadia Silva (20) 
Ayelén Stepnik (6) 
Belén Succi (28) 
Paola Vukojicic (18) 

Coach: Gabriel Minadeo—February

Gabriela Aguirre (22) 
Magdalena Aicega (3) 
Laura Aladro (13) 
Luciana Aymar (8) 
Noel Barrionuevo (27) 
Agustina Bouza (9) 
Claudia Burkart (24) 
Amalia Cerutti 
Silvina D'Elía (25) 
Soledad García (10) 
Mariana González Oliva (12) 
Alejandra Gulla (7) 
María de la Paz Hernández (15) 
Giselle Kañevsky (26) 
Rosario Luchetti (4) 
Daniela Maloberti (16) 
Mercedes Margalot (14) 
Belén Pallitto (5) 
Mariana Pozzolo 
Carla Rebecchi (11) 
Belén Rivas (29) 
Sofía Román (30) 
Mariné Russo (19) 
Nadia Silva (20) 
Belén Succi (1) 
Paola Vukojicic (18) 

Coach: Gabriel Minadeo—January

Gabriela Aguirre (22) 
Magdalena Aicega (3) 
Laura Aladro (13) 
Luciana Aymar (8) 
Noel Barrionuevo (27) 
Agustina Bouza (9) 
Claudia Burkart (24) 
Silvina D'Elía (25) 
Soledad García (10) 
Mariana González Oliva (12) 
Alejandra Gulla (7) 
María de la Paz Hernández (15) 
Giselle Kañevsky (26) 
Rosario Luchetti (4) 
Mercedes Margalot (14) 
Belén Pallitto (5) 
Carla Rebecchi (11) 
Mariana Rossi (16) 
Mariné Russo (19) 
Belén Succi (1) 
Paola Vukojicic (18) 

Coach: Gabriel Minadeo—January

Macarena Abente (15) 
Gabriela Aguirre (22) 
Laura Aladro (13) 
Inés Arrondo (21) 
Luciana Aymar (8) 
Noel Barrionuevo (27) 
Claudia Burkart (24) 
Silvina D'Elía (25) 
Ivana Dell'Era (23) 
Soledad García (10) 
Alejandra Gulla (7) 
Giselle Kañevsky (26) 
Rosario Luchetti (4) 
Mercedes Margalot (14) 
Delfina Merino (2) 
Sol Parral (6) 
Carla Rebecchi (11) 
Yanina Rojas (9) 
Mariana Rossi (16) 
Mariné Russo (19) 
Rocío Sánchez Moccia (5) 
Daniela Sruoga (18) 
Belén Succi (1) 
Victoria Villalba (17) 
Victoria Zuloaga (20) 

Coach: Carlos Retegui—March

Macarena Abente (15) 
Gabriela Aguirre (22) 
Laura Aladro (13) 
Carolina Armani 
Carolina Arrieta 
Luciana Aymar (8) 
Noel Barrionuevo (27) 
Claudia Burkart (24) 
Florencia Calvete 
Florencia D'Elía 
Silvina D'Elía (25) 
Laura del Colle (31) 
Ivana Dell'Era (23) 
Carla Dupuy (9) 
Geraldine Fresco Pisani (17) 
Soledad García (10) 
Kim Grant 
Alejandra Gulla (7) 
Giselle Kañevsky (26) 
Rosario Luchetti (4) 
Pilar Méjico (32) 
Candelaria Méndez 
Delfina Merino (2) 
Sol Parral 
Carla Rebecchi (11) 
Mariana Rossi (16) 
Mariné Russo (19) 
Rocío Sánchez Moccia (5) 
Mariela Scarone (21) 
Daniela Sruoga (18) 
Josefina Sruoga (30) 
Ayelén Stepnik (6) 
Belén Succi (1) 
Rocío Ubeira (12) 
Josefina Wohlfeiler 
Victoria Zuloaga (20) 

Coach: Carlos Retegui—March

Macarena Abente (15) 
Laura Aladro (13) 
Luciana Aymar (8) 
Noel Barrionuevo (27) 
Claudia Burkart (24) 
Marcela Casale (32) 
Silvina D'Elía (25) 
Carla Dupuy (9) 
Soledad García (10) 
Alejandra Gulla (7) 
Giselle Kañevsky (26) 
Rosario Luchetti (4) 
Sofía Maccari 
Pilar Méjico (31) 
Delfina Merino (12) 
Carla Rebecchi (11) 
Macarena Rodríguez (5) 
Cecilia Rognoni (16) 
Mariana Rossi (2) 
Mariné Russo (19) 
Mariela Scarone (21) 
Daniela Sruoga (18) 
Josefina Sruoga (30) 
Belén Succi (1) 
Romina Vatteone (14) Florencia CalvetePilar Campoy (17)Martina Cavallero (8b)Jimena CedrésIvana Dell'EraMaría José Fernández (21b)Eugenia FerreroGeraldine Fresco PisaniDenisse FuhrRocío González Canda (23)Kim GrantMaría GuajardoRomina Lozzia (11b)Julieta Medici (14b)Sol Parral (3)Josefina Segura (22)Mercedes Socino (4b)Luciana Soraco (16b)Mariana TarelliRocío Ubeira (12b)Belén Zavalía (29)Victoria Zuloaga (20)

Coach: Carlos Retegui—April (Olympic Projection Group)Macarena Abente (15)Constanza AguirreFlorencia CalvetePilar Campoy (17)Martina Cavallero (8)Natalia del FrariMaría José Fernández (21)Denisse FuhrRocío González Canda (23)Laura KraselnikRomina Lozzia (11)Aylín MartínezJulieta Medici (14)Pilar Méjico (31)Tatiana MinadeoMercedes MoreschiBárbara MuzaberMercedes Socino (4)Luciana Soraco (16)Mercedes StorniniBelén Zavalía (29)Victoria Zuloaga (20)

Coach: Carlos Retegui—September

Macarena Abente (15) 
Laura Aladro (13) 
Luciana Aymar (8) 
Noel Barrionuevo (27) 
Marcela Casale (32) 
Martina Cavallero 
Jimena Cedrés 
Silvina D'Elía (25) 
Laura del Colle 
Carla Dupuy (9) 
Soledad García (10) 
María José Fernández (24) 
Giselle Kañevsky (26) 
Rosario Luchetti (4) 
Delfina Merino (12) 
Melisa Pinter 
Carla Rebecchi (11) 
Macarena Rodríguez (5) 
Mariela Scarone (21) 
Luciana Soracco (16) 
Daniela Sruoga (18) 
Josefina Sruoga (30) 
Belén Succi (1) 
Belén Zavalía (29) 
Victoria Zuloaga (20) 

Coach: Carlos Retegui—September (Olympic Projection Group)Gabriela AguirreAgustina AlbertarioJulieta AlonsoAgustina BouzaCamila BustosFlorencia CalveteNatalia del FrariBelén FaccianoEugenia GarraffoRocío González CandaFlorencia HabifAna López BasavilbasoRomina LozziaGabriela LudueñaSofía MaccariAylín MartínezJulieta MediciTatiana MinadeoBárbara MuzaberÁngeles OrtizSofía PaglioneMailén PiparoVictoria RichardsAyelén RoldánFlorencia SachetoRocío Sánchez MocciaMercedes SocinoMercedes StorniniCoach: Carlos Retegui—January

Laura Aladro (13) 
Luciana Aymar (8) 
Noel Barrionuevo (27) 
Marcela Casale (32) 
Martina Cavallero (14) 
Jimena Cedrés (7) 
Silvina D'Elía (25) 
Natalia del Frari (6) 
Carla Dupuy (9) 
Soledad García (10) 
Eugenia Garraffo (28) 
Rocío González Canda (24) 
Florencia Habif (16) 
Giselle Kañevsky (26) 
Ana López Basavilbaso (23) 
Rosario Luchetti (4) 
Sofía Maccari (19) 
Delfina Merino (12) 
Carla Rebecchi (11) 
Macarena Rodríguez (5) 
Rocío Sánchez Moccia (17) 
Julia Simonassi 
Mariela Scarone (21) 
Daniela Sruoga (18) 
Josefina Sruoga (30) 
Belén Succi (1) 
Victoria Zuloaga (20) Macarena AbenteConstanza Aguirre (7b)Agustina AlbertarioJulieta AlonsoAgustina Bouza (10b)Camila Bustos (11b)Victoria CabutFlorencia CalveteCarla de BertiBelén Facciano (5b)María José Fernández (21b)Denisse FuhrVictoria GranattoGabriela KoltesRomina Lozzia (15b)Gabriela LudueñaValentina Magnone (1b)Aylín MartínezEugenia Mastronardi (24b)Tatiana MinadeoBárbara Muzaber (19b)Martina OcampoMacarena Pescador (17b)Melisa PinterVictoria Sauze (20b)Mercedes Socino (4b)Luciana SoraccoMercedes StorniniSol VillarBelén Zavalía LagosCoach: Carlos Retegui—March

Laura Aladro (13) 
Carolina Armani 
Luciana Aymar (8) 
Noel Barrionuevo (27) 
Marcela Casale (32) 
Martina Cavallero (14) 
Jimena Cedrés (7) 
Silvina D'Elía (25) 
Natalia del Frari (6) 
Carla Dupuy (9) 
Soledad García (10) 
Eugenia Garraffo (28) 
Rocío González Canda (24) 
Florencia Habif (16) 
Giselle Kañevsky (26) 
Ana López Basavilbaso (23) 
Rosario Luchetti (4) 
Sofía Maccari (19) 
Delfina Merino (12) 
Carla Rebecchi (11) 
Macarena Rodríguez (5) 
Rocío Sánchez Moccia (17) 
Julia Simonassi 
Mariela Scarone (21) 
Daniela Sruoga (18) 
Josefina Sruoga (30) 
Belén Succi (1) 
Roberta Werthein (15) 
Victoria Zuloaga (20) Agustina BouzaSofía CesanelliCarla de BertiMartina del CerroBelén FaccianoNatalia GalíndezGiselle JuárezGabriela LudueñaValentina MagnoneAylín MartínezCristina MartínezEugenia MastronardiJulieta MediciMacarena PescadorMelisa PinterVictoria SauzeMercedes SocinoBelén Zavalía LagosCoach: Carlos Retegui—December

Constanza Aguirre (29) 
Laura Aladro (13)  
Agustina Albertario (26) 
Luciana Aymar (8) 
Noel Barrionuevo (27) 
Marcela Casale (32) 
Martina Cavallero (14) 
Jimena Cedrés (7) 
Silvina D'Elía (25) 
Laura del Colle (31) 
Carla Dupuy (9) 
Nahir El Barri 
María José Fernández (6) 
Florencia Habif (16) 
Giselle Juárez (22) 
Rosario Luchetti (4) 
Sofía Maccari (19) 
Delfina Merino (12) 
Macarena Rodríguez (5) 
Rocío Sánchez Moccia (17) 
Mariela Scarone (21) 
Daniela Sruoga (18) 
Josefina Sruoga (30) 
Belén Succi (1) 
Roberta Werthein (15) 

Coach: Carlos Retegui—January

Constanza Aguirre (29) 
Laura Aladro (13) 
Luciana Aymar (8) 
Noel Barrionuevo (27) 
Marcela Casale (32) 
Martina Cavallero (14) 
Jimena Cedrés (6) 
Silvina D'Elía (25) 
Laura del Colle (31) 
Nahir El Barri 
María José Fernández (24) 
Florencia Habif (16) 
Giselle Juárez (22) 
Ana López Basavilbaso (23) 
Rosario Luchetti (4) 
Sofía Maccari (19) 
Delfina Merino (12) 
Agustina Metidieri (3) 
Carla Rebecchi (11) 
Macarena Rodríguez (5) 
Rocío Sánchez Moccia (17) 
Mariela Scarone (21) 
Daniela Sruoga (18) 
Josefina Sruoga (30) 
Belén Succi (1) 
Roberta Werthein (15) 

Coach: Carlos Retegui—February

Luciana Aymar (8) 
Noel Barrionuevo (27) 
Martina Cavallero (7) 
Silvina D'Elía (25) 
Laura del Colle (1) 
María José Fernández (24) 
Julieta Franco (2) 
Florencia Habif (16) 
Rosario Luchetti (4) 
Sofía Maccari (19) 
Mercedes Margalot (14) 
Delfina Merino (12) 
Florencia Mutio (31) 
Carla Rebecchi (11) 
Macarena Rodríguez (5) 
Mariné Russo 
Rocío Sánchez Moccia (17) 
Mariela Scarone (21) 
Daniela Sruoga (18) 
Josefina Sruoga (30) 
Belén Succi (28) 
Roberta Werthein (15) 

Coach: Carlos Retegui—June

Luciana Aymar (8) 
Noel Barrionuevo (27) 
Martina Cavallero (7) 
Jimena Cedrés (6) 
Silvina D'Elía (25) 
Carla de Berti (28B) 
Laura del Colle (1) 
Carla Dupuy (9) 
María José Fernández (24) 
Julieta Franco (2) 
Julia Gomes Fantasia (29) 
Florencia Habif (16) 
Giselle Juárez (22) 
Ana López Basavilbaso (23) 
Rosario Luchetti (4) 
Gabriela Ludueña (26) 
Sofía Maccari (19) 
Mercedes Margalot (14) 
Delfina Merino (12) 
Florencia Mutio (31) 
Carla Rebecchi (11) 
Macarena Rodríguez (5) 
Rocío Sánchez Moccia (17) 
Mariela Scarone (21) 
Daniela Sruoga (18) 
Josefina Sruoga (30) 
Belén Succi (28) 
Roberta Werthein (15) 

Coach: Marcelo Garraffo—January

Luciana Aymar (8) 
Noel Barrionuevo (27) 
Florencia Calvete 
Martina Cavallero (7) 
Sofía Cesanelli (32) 
Silvina D'Elía (25) 
Laura del Colle (1) 
Natalia del Frari (24) 
Ivana Dell'Era (28) 
Carla Dupuy (9) 
Ana López Basavilbaso (23) 
Giselle Juárez (22) 
Rosario Luchetti (4) 
Gabriela Ludueña (26) 
Sofía Maccari (19) 
Delfina Merino (12) 
Florencia Mutio (31) 
Carla Rebecchi (11) 
Macarena Rodríguez (5) 
Rocío Sánchez Moccia (17) 
Mariela Scarone (21) 
Daniela Sruoga (18) 
Josefina Sruoga (30) 
Victoria Zuloaga (20) 

Coach: Emanuel Roggero—May

Laura Aladro (13) 
Agustina Albertario 
Luciana Aymar (8) 
Noel Barrionuevo (27) 
Martina Cavallero (7) 
Sofía Cesanelli (32) 
Silvina D'Elía (25) 
Laura del Colle (1) 
María José Fernández (24) 
Florencia Habif (16) 
Giselle Juárez (22) 
Ana López Basavilbaso (23) 
Rosario Luchetti (4) 
Gabriela Ludueña (26) 
Sofía Maccari (19) 
Delfina Merino (12) 
Florencia Mutio (31) 
Carla Rebecchi (11) 
Macarena Rodríguez (5) 
Rocío Sánchez Moccia (17) 
Mariela Scarone (21) 
Daniela Sruoga (18) 
Josefina Sruoga (30) 
Belén Succi (28) 
Victoria Zuloaga (20) 

Coach: Emanuel Roggero—August

Gabriela Aguirre  
Laura Aladro (13) 
Agustina Albertario (19) 
Luciana Aymar (8) 
Noel Barrionuevo (27) 
Martina Cavallero (7) 
Silvina D'Elía (25) 
Julia Gomes Fantasia (29) 
Agustina Habif (14) 
Florencia Habif (16) 
Giselle Juárez (22) 
Ana López Basavilbaso (23) 
Rosario Luchetti (4) 
Gabriela Ludueña (26) 
Delfina Merino (12) 
Florencia Mutio (31) 
Carla Rebecchi (11) 
Macarena Rodríguez (5) 
Pilar Romang (24) 
Mariana Rossi (2) 
Rocío Sánchez Moccia (17) 
Mariela Scarone (21) 
Daniela Sruoga (18) 
Josefina Sruoga (30) 
Belén Succi (1) 

Coach: Carlos Retegui—January

Laura Aladro (13) 
Agustina Albertario (19) 
Luciana Aymar (8) 
Noel Barrionuevo (27) 
Martina Cavallero (7) 
Sofía Cesanelli (32) 
Silvina D'Elía (25) 
Julia Gomes Fantasia (29) 
Agustina Habif (14) 
Florencia Habif (16) 
Giselle Juárez (22) 
Ana López Basavilbaso (23) 
Rosario Luchetti (4) 
Gabriela Ludueña (26) 
Delfina Merino (12) 
Florencia Mutio (31) 
Ivanna Pessina (15) 
Carla Rebecchi (11) 
Macarena Rodriguez (5) 
Pilar Romang (24) 
Mariana Rossi (2) 
Rocío Sánchez Moccia (17) 
Mariela Scarone (21) 
Daniela Sruoga (18) 
Josefina Sruoga (30) 
Belén Succi (1) Antonella Brondello (2b)Jimena Cedrés (3)Carla Dupuy (9)Victoria Sauze (6)

Coach: Santiago Capurro—July

Laura Aladro (13) 
Agustina Albertario (19) 
Luciana Aymar (8) 
Noel Barrionuevo (27) 
Martina Cavallero (7) 
Jimena Cedrés (6) 
Silvina D'Elía (25) 
Julia Gomes Fantasia (29) 
Agustina Habif (14) 
Florencia Habif (16) 
Giselle Juárez (22) 
Gabriela Koltes 
Rosario Luchetti (4) 
Delfina Merino (12) 
Agustina Metidieri (3) 
Luciana Molina (20) 
Florencia Mutio (31) 
Lara Oviedo (23) 
Carla Rebecchi (11) 
Macarena Rodríguez (5) 
Pilar Romang (24) 
Mariana Rossi (2) 
Rocío Sánchez Moccia (17) 
Mariana Scandura (32) 
Mariela Scarone (21) 
Daniela Sruoga (18) 
Josefina Sruoga (30) 
Belén Succi (1) 
Sofía Villarroya (15) 

Coach: Santiago Capurro—January

Laura Aladro (13) 
Agustina Albertario (19) 
Noel Barrionuevo (27) 
Martina Cavallero (7) 
Jimena Cedrés (6) 
Silvina D'Elía (25) 
Julia Gomes Fantasia (29) 
Agustina Habif (14) 
Florencia Habif (16) 
Giselle Juárez (22) 
Rosario Luchetti (4) 
Julieta Medici (9) 
Delfina Merino (12) 
Agustina Metidieri (3) 
Luciana Molina (20) 
Florencia Mutio (31) 
Lara Oviedo (23) 
Carla Rebecchi (11) 
Macarena Rodríguez (5) 
Pilar Romang (24) 
Rocío Sánchez Moccia (17) 
Mariana Scandura (32) 
Mariela Scarone (21) 
Josefina Sruoga (30) 
Belén Succi (1) 
Sofía Toccalino (2) 
Sofía Villarroya (15) 

Coach: Santiago Capurro—August

Laura Aladro (13) 
Agustina Albertario (19) 
Noel Barrionuevo (27) 
Pilar Campoy (23) 
Martina Cavallero (7) 
Jimena Cedrés (6) 
Ivana Dell'Era (18) 
Carla Dupuy (9) 
Julia Gomes Fantasia (29) 
María José Granatto (15) 
Agustina Habif (14) 
Florencia Habif (16) 
Julieta Jankunas (28) 
Giselle Juárez (22) 
Delfina Merino (12) 
Luciana Molina (20) 
Florencia Mutio (31) 
Paula Ortiz (26) 
Carla Rebecchi (11) 
Pilar Romang (24) 
Rocío Sánchez Moccia (17) 
Mariana Scandura (32) 
Josefina Sruoga (30) 
Belén Succi (1) 
Sofía Toccalino (2) 
Eugenia Trinchinetti (4) 
Victoria Zuloaga (3) 

Coach: Gabriel Minadeo—October

Laura Aladro (13) 
Agustina Albertario (19) 
Noel Barrionuevo (27) 
Claudia Burkart (24) 
Pilar Campoy (23) 
Martina Cavallero (7) 
Jimena Cedrés (6) 
Carla Dupuy (9) 
Julia Gomes Fantasia (29) 
María José Granatto (15) 
Agustina Habif (14) 
Florencia Habif (16) 
Delfina Merino (12) 
Carla Rebecchi (11) 
Pilar Romang (18) 
Rocío Sánchez Moccia (17) 
Belén Succi (1) 
Sofía Toccalino (2) 
Eugenia Trinchinetti (4) 
Victoria Zuloaga (3) 
Observed in November:Gabriela AguirreMicaela AngelinoCarolina AzzaroAntonella BrondelloSofía DarnayFlorencia de AndreisFrancesca GiovanelliVictoria GranattoAna López BasavilbasoAgustina MetidieriSofía MonserratLara OviedoAntonella RinaldiVictoria SauzeCoach: Gabriel Minadeo

Gabriela Aguirre (25) 
Laura Aladro (13) 
Agustina Albertario (19) 
Noel Barrionuevo (27) 
Claudia Burkart (24) 
Pilar Campoy (23) 
Martina Cavallero (7) 
Jimena Cedrés (6) 
Carla Dupuy (9) 
Julia Gomes Fantasia (29) 
María José Granatto (15) 
Agustina Habif (14) 
Florencia Habif (16) 
Julieta Jankunas (28) 
Giselle Juárez (22) 
Delfina Merino (12) 
Florencia Mutio (31) 
Paula Ortiz (26) 
Carla Rebecchi (11) 
Pilar Romang (18) 
Rocío Sánchez Moccia (17) 
Belén Succi (1) 
Sofía Toccalino (2) 
Eugenia Trinchinetti (4) 
Lucina von der Heyde (20) 
Victoria Zuloaga (3) Clara BarberiSofía DarnayBárbara Dichiara (2)Magdalena Fernández Ladra (10)Francesca GiovanelliVictoria GranattoCatalina LabakeLara OviedoVictoria SauzeMercedes SocinoCoach: Gabriel Minadeo—January

Agustina Albertario (19) 
Agostina Alonso (5) 
Clara Barberi (30) 
Bárbara Dichiara (24) 
Bianca Donati (6) 
Pilar Campoy (23) 
Martina Cavallero (7) 
Magdalena Fernández Ladra (10) 
Milagros Fernández Ladra (21) 
Julia Gomes Fantasia (29) 
Agustina Gorzelany (3) 
María José Granatto (15) 
Agustina Habif (14) 
Florencia Habif (16) 
Julieta Jankunas (28) 
Priscila Jardel (9) 
Giselle Juárez (22) 
Delfina Merino (12) 
Florencia Mutio (31) 
Paula Ortiz (26) 
Carla Rebecchi (11) 
Azul Rossetti (13) 
Rocío Sánchez Moccia (17) 
Victoria Sauze (18) 
Belén Succi (1) 
Sofía Toccalino (2) 
Eugenia Trinchinetti (4) 
Lucina von der Heyde (20) 

Coach: Agustín Corradini—May

Agustina Albertario (19) 
Agostina Alonso (5) 
Clara Barberi (30) 
Noel Barrionuevo (27) 
Silvina D'Elía (25) 
Bárbara Dichiara (24) 
Bianca Donati (6) 
Pilar Campoy (23) 
Martina Cavallero (7) 
Magdalena Fernández Ladra (10) 
Milagros Fernández Ladra (21) 
Julia Gomes Fantasia (29) 
Agustina Gorzelany (3) 
María José Granatto (15) 
Agustina Habif (14) 
Florencia Habif (16) 
Julieta Jankunas (28) 
Priscila Jardel (9) 
Giselle Juárez (22) 
Delfina Merino (12) 
Florencia Mutio (31) 
Paula Ortiz (26) 
Azul Rossetti (13) 
Rocío Sánchez Moccia (17) 
Victoria Sauze (18) 
Belén Succi (1) 
Sofía Toccalino (2) 
Eugenia Trinchinetti (4) 
Lucina von der Heyde (20) 

Coach: Agustín Corradini—September

Agustina Albertario (19) 
Agostina Alonso (5) 
Noel Barrionuevo (27) 
Bárbara Dichiara (24) 
Bianca Donati (6) 
Pilar Campoy (23) 
Martina Cavallero (7) 
Magdalena Fernández Ladra (10) 
Milagros Fernández Ladra (21) 
Julia Gomes Fantasia (29) 
Agustina Gorzelany (3) 
María José Granatto (15) 
Agustina Habif (14) 
Florencia Habif (16) 
Julieta Jankunas (28) 
Priscila Jardel (9) 
Delfina Merino (12) 
Florencia Mutio (31) 
Paula Ortiz (26) 
Azul Rossetti (13) 
Rocío Sánchez Moccia (17) 
Victoria Sauze (18) 
Belén Succi (1) 
Sofía Toccalino (2) 
Eugenia Trinchinetti (4) 
Lucina von der Heyde (20) Bárbara BorgiaFrancesca GiovanelliCatalina LabakeCamila MachínMaia PustilnikMariana ScanduraDelfina Thome GustavinoCoach: Agustín Corradini—January

Agustina Albertario (19) 
Agostina Alonso (5) 
Noel Barrionuevo (27) 
Pilar Campoy (23) 
Martina Cavallero (7) 
Bárbara Dichiara (24) 
Bianca Donati (6) 
Magdalena Fernández Ladra (10) 
Milagros Fernández Ladra (21) 
Julia Gomes Fantasia (29) 
Agustina Gorzelany (3) 
María José Granatto (15) 
Agustina Habif (14) 
Florencia Habif (16) 
Julieta Jankunas (28) 
Priscila Jardel (9) 
Delfina Merino (12) 
Florencia Mutio (31) 
Paula Ortiz (26) 
Azul Rossetti (13) 
Rocío Sánchez Moccia (17) 
Victoria Sauze (18) 
Belén Succi (1) 
Sofía Toccalino (2) 
Eugenia Trinchinetti (4) 
Lucina von der Heyde (20) Bárbara Borgia (17b)Jimena CedrésCelina di SantoFrancesca GiovanelliCatalina Labake (11)Camila Machín (22)
Victoria Miranda
Gianella PaletMaia PustilnikFlorencia SaraviaMariana Scandura (32)
Added in August:
Carla Rebecchi (11) Abril VázquezCoach: Carlos Retegui—January

 Agustina Albertario (19) 
 Agostina Alonso (5) 
 Agostina Ayala (30) 
 Noel Barrionuevo (27) 
 Brisa Bruggesser (35) 
 Paulina Carrizo 
 Cristina Cosentino (13) 
 Valentina Costa Biondi (32—played first match with #3) 
 Silvina D'Elía (25) 
 Celina di Santo (24) 
 Bianca Donati (6) 
 Magdalena Fernández Ladra 
 Milagros Fernández Ladra 
 Agustina Gorzelany 
 María José Granatto (15) 
 Victoria Granatto (21) 
 Agustina Habif (14) 
 Florencia Habif (16) 
 Julieta Jankunas (28) 
 Priscila Jardel (9) 
 Catalina Labake 
 Rosario Luchetti (4) 
 Delfina Merino (12) 
 Victoria Miranda (29) 
 Florencia Mutio (31) 
 Paula Ortiz (26) 
 Carla Rebecchi (11) 
 Micaela Retegui (23) 
 Rocío Sánchez Moccia (17) 
 Victoria Sauze (18) 
 Belén Succi (1) 
 Sofía Toccalino (2) 
 Eugenia Trinchinetti (22) 
 Lucina von der Heyde (20) 
Added in February:
 Luciana Galimberti
 Victoria Zuloaga (3)
Added in April:
 Juanita Ayerza
 Noel Barrionuevo (27)
 Giselle Kañevsky (7)
 Sol Lombardo (37)
 Daiana Pacheco
 Mariana Scandura (36)
Added in July:
 Valentina Frías
Added in September:
 Constanza Cerundolo (38)
 Agustina Gorzelany (3)
 Sofía Ramallo (34)
 Josefina Rübenacker (33)
 Rocío Sánchez Moccia (17)
Added in October:
 Delfina Thome (39)

Coach: Carlos Retegui—January

 Agustina Albertario (19) 
 Agostina Alonso (5) 
 Noel Barrionuevo (27) 
 Brisa Bruggesser (35) 
 Constanza Cerundolo (38) 
 Cristina Cosentino (13) 
 Valentina Costa Biondi (32) 
 Silvina D'Elía (25) 
 Celina di Santo (24) 
 Bianca Donati (6) 
 Agustina Gorzelany (3) 
 María José Granatto (15) 
 Victoria Granatto (21) 
 Julieta Jankunas (28) 
 Priscila Jardel (9) 
 Giselle Kañevsky (7) 
 Rosario Luchetti (4) 
 Delfina Merino (12) 
 Victoria Miranda (29) 
 Sofía Ramallo (34) 
 Carla Rebecchi (11) 
 Micaela Retegui (23) 
 Josefina Rübenacker (33) 
 Rocío Sánchez Moccia (17) 
 Victoria Sauze (18) 
 Mariana Scandura (36) 
 Belén Succi (1) 
 Delfina Thome (39) 
 Sofía Toccalino (2) 
 Eugenia Trinchinetti (22) 
Added in February:
 Emilia Forcherio (40) 

Coach: Carlos Retegui—July

 Agustina Albertario (19) 
 Agostina Alonso (5) 
 Clara Barberi 
 Noel Barrionuevo (27) 
 Brisa Bruggesser (35) 
 Pilar Campoy 
 Jimena Cedrés 
 Constanza Cerundolo (38) 
 Cristina Cosentino (13) 
 Valentina Costa Biondi (32) 
 Silvina D'Elía (25) 
 Celina di Santo (24) 
 Bárbara Dichiara 
 Emilia Forcherio (40) 
 Agustina Gorzelany (3) 
 María José Granatto (15) 
 Victoria Granatto (21) 
 Julieta Jankunas (28) 
 Giselle Kañevsky (7) 
 Rosario Luchetti (4) 
 Delfina Merino (12) 
 Victoria Miranda (29) 
 Gianella Palet 
 Sofía Ramallo (34) 
 Carla Rebecchi (11) 
 Micaela Retegui (23) 
 Josefina Rübenacker (33) 
 Rocío Sánchez Moccia (17) 
 Victoria Sauze (18) 
 Mariana Scandura (36) 
 Belén Succi (1) 
 Delfina Thome (39) 
 Sofía Toccalino (2) 
 Eugenia Trinchinetti (22) 
Added in September:
 Guadalupe Adorno 
 Bianca Donati (6) 
 Guadalupe Fernández Lacort 
 Juliana Guggini 
 Sofía Maccari 
Added in November:
 Silvina D'Elía (25) 
 Inés Delpech 

Coach: Carlos Retegui—January

 Agustina Albertario (19) 
 Agostina Alonso (5) 
 Clara Barberi (14) 
 Noel Barrionuevo (27) 
 Constanza Cerundolo (38) 
 Cristina Cosentino (13) 
 Valentina Costa Biondi (32) 
 Silvina D'Elía (25) 
 Celina di Santo (24) 
 Inés Delpech (37) 
 Bárbara Dichiara (16) 
 Bianca Donati (6) 
 Emilia Forcherio (40) 
 Agustina Gorzelany (3) 
 María José Granatto (15) 
 Victoria Granatto (21) 
 Juliana Guggini (24 -just once-) 
 Julieta Jankunas (28) 
 Rosario Luchetti (4) 
 Sofía Maccari (26) 
 Delfina Merino (12) 
 Victoria Miranda (29) 
 Sol Pagella (43) 
 Mariana Pineda (42)
 Valentina Raposo (41) 
 Micaela Retegui (23) 
 Victoria Sauze (18) 
 Mariana Scandura (36) 
 Belén Succi (1) 
 Delfina Thome (39) 
 Sofía Toccalino (2) 
 Eugenia Trinchinetti (22) 
Added in April:
 Rocío Sánchez Moccia (17) 
Added in May:
 Paula Pasquettin

Coach: Fernando Ferrara—November

 Agustina Albertario (7) 
 Agostina Alonso (5) 
 Clara Barberi (14) 
 Noel Barrionuevo 
 Jimena Cedrés (25) 
 Cristina Cosentino (13) 
 Valentina Costa Biondi (32) 
 Bárbara Dichiara (16) 
 Emilia Forcherio (40) 
 Agustina Gorzelany (3) 
 María José Granatto (10) 
 Julieta Jankunas (28) 
 Sol Lombardo 
 Valentina Marcucci 
 Delfina Merino (12) 
 Valentina Raposo (20) 
 Micaela Retegui (23) 
 Rocío Sánchez Moccia (17) 
 Victoria Sauze (18) 
 Belén Succi (1) 
 Delfina Thome (39) 
 Sofía Toccalino (2) 
 Eugenia Trinchinetti (22) 
 Martina Triñanes 
Added in December:
 Sofía Cairo 
 Celina di Santo (24) 
 Daiana Pacheco 

Coach: Fernando Ferrara—January

 Agustina Albertario (7) 
 Agostina Alonso (5) 
 Clara Barberi (14) 
 Sofía Cairó (4) 
 Jimena Cedrés (25) 
 Cristina Cosentino (13) 
 Valentina Costa Biondi (32) 
 Celina di Santo (24) 
 Bárbara Dichiara (16) 
 Emilia Forcherio (40) 
 Agustina Gorzelany (3) 
 María José Granatto (10) 
 Julieta Jankunas (28) 
 Sol Lombardo (44) 
 Valentina Marcucci (31) 
 Delfina Merino (9) 
 Daiana Pacheco (46) 
 Valentina Raposo (20) 
 Micaela Retegui (23) 
 Rocío Sánchez Moccia (17) 
 Victoria Sauze (18) 
 Belén Succi (1) 
 Delfina Thome (39) 
 Sofía Toccalino (2) 
 Eugenia Trinchinetti (22) 
 Martina Triñanes (30) 
Added in February:
 Brisa Bruggesser (35)
 Constanza Cerundolo (38)
 Victoria Granatto (21) 
 Victoria Miranda (29)
 Sol Pagella (43)
 Lourdes Pérez Iturraspe (48)
 Mariana Pineda (47)

Coach: Fernando Ferrara—April

 Agustina Albertario (7) 
 Agostina Alonso (5) 
 Clara Barberi (14) 
 Sofía Cairó (4) 
 Jimena Cedrés (25) 
 Cristina Cosentino (13) 
 Valentina Costa Biondi (32) 
 Emilia Forcherio (6) 
 Agustina Gorzelany (3) 
 María José Granatto (10) 
 Victoria Granatto (21) 
 Julieta Jankunas (28) 
 Sol Lombardo (44) 
 Valentina Marcucci (31) 
 Daiana Pacheco (46) 
 Valentina Raposo (20) 
 Rocío Sánchez Moccia (17) 
 Victoria Sauze (18) 
 Belén Succi (1) 
 Delfina Thome (39) 
 Sofía Toccalino (2) 
 Eugenia Trinchinetti (22) 

Coach: Fernando Ferrara—September

 Guadalupe Adorno (42) 
 Agustina Albertario (7) 
 Agostina Alonso (5) 
 Catalina Andrade (45) 
 Clara Barberi (14) 
 Sofía Cairó (20) 
 Pilar Campoy (26) 
 Jimena Cedrés (25) 
 Constanza Cerundolo (38) 
 Cristina Cosentino (13) 
 Valentina Costa Biondi (32) 
 Inés Delpech (37) 
 Celina di Santo (24) 
 Bárbara Dichiara (16) 
 Ana Luz Dodorico (15) 
 Bianca Donati (35) 
 Juana Fajardo (40) 
 Emilia Forcherio (40) 
 Magdalena Fernández Ladra (36) 
 Milagros Fernández Ladra (41) 
 Agustina Gorzelany (3) 
 María José Granatto (10) 
 Julieta Jankunas (28) 
 Sol Lombardo (44) 
 Victoria Manuele (19) 
 Valentina Marcucci (31) 
 Victoria Miranda (29) 
 Paula Ortiz (39) 
 Daiana Pacheco (46) 
 Sol Pagella (43) 
 Gianella Palet (33) 
 Lourdes Pérez Iturraspe (48) 
 Mariana Pineda (47) 
 Valentina Raposo (4) 
 Rocío Sánchez Moccia (17) 
 Lucía Sanguinetti (34) 
 Victoria Sauze (18) 
 Delfina Thome (11) 
 Sofía Toccalino (2) 
 Eugenia Trinchinetti (22) 
 Martina Triñanes (30) 
 Lucina von der Heyde (21) 
 Inés Welsh 

: Players overlined were initially called-up but quit or got retired before any competition of that year.
: Players in italic are part of a projection group or invitational.

Squad records by olympic cycles in official competitions

As regards Olympic's hockey competition, Argentina participated in 1988 and in every edition since 1996.

There are no records of the squads for the World Cup from 1974 until 1990, except for the 1983 edition. Argentina participated in all the editions of the competition.Player of the Tournament: 
Luciana Aymar at 2000 Champions TrophyGoalkeeper of the Tournament:
Laura Mulhall at 1998 World CupGoalscorer of the tournament:
Vanina Oneto at 1999 Pan American Games (8 goals).Player of the Tournament: 
Luciana Aymar at 2001, 2003 Champions Trophy; 2002 World Cup; 2004 Pan American Cup.
Cecilia Rognoni at 2002 Champions TrophyTop Scorer:
Vanina Oneto at 2002 Champions Trophy (6 goals) and 2004 Pan American Cup (10 goals).
Cecilia Rognoni at 2001 Pan American Cup (14 goals).Player of the Tournament: 
Luciana Aymar at 2004, 2005 and 2008 Champions Trophy.Young Player of the Tournament: 
Carla Rebecchi at 2006 World CupTop Scorer:
Gabriela Aguirre at 2006 South American Games (5 goals).
Noel Barrionuevo at 2007 Champions Trophy (5 goals)
Soledad García at 2005 Champions Trophy (4 goals)
Alejandra Gulla at 2004 Champions Trophy (6 goals)Young Player of the Tournament: 
Paula Ortiz at 2017 Panamerican Cup
Lucina von der Heyde at 2018 World CupTop Scorer: 
Noel Barrionuevo at 2017 Panamerican Cup (5 goals)
Pilar Campoy at 2018 South American Games (8 goals).
Julieta Jankunas at 2019 Panamerican Games (11 goals)
Delfina Merino at 2017 World League Final (5 goals)

Paris 2024Player of the Tournament: 
María José Granatto at 2022 Panamerican Cup and 2022 World CupTop Goalscorer: 
Agustina Gorzelany at 2022 World CupBest Goalkeeper'': 
Belén Succi at 2022 World Cup

 Current player

Medal table

Below are included titles and awards earned in the following competitions: World Cup, World League, Pro League, Olympics, Champions Trophy, Pan American Games and Pan American Cup.

See also
Argentina women's national under-21 field hockey team
Argentina men's national field hockey squad records

References 

Record